The Royal Gwent Hospital is a local general hospital in the city of Newport. It is managed by the Aneurin Bevan University Health Board.
Since 2020, the hospital no longer has a full Emergency Department, and redirects those with a serious illness or injury to call 999 or go to attend the Grange University Hospital in Cwmbran.
The Royal Gwent hospital has a 24-hour Minor Injuries Unit.

History

The hospital has its origins in the Newport Dispensary which was founded in Llanarth Street in 1839 and received its first-in-patients as the Newport Dispensary and Infirmary in 1867.

It moved to a site in Cardiff Road donated by Viscount Tredegar in the early 20th century: it was officially opened there by Viscount Tredegar as the Newport and Monmouthshire Hospital in August 1901. It changed its name to the Royal Gwent Hospital in 1913.

The hospital joined the National Health Service in 1948: it was then completely reconstructed to create modern facilities in the early 1960s.

During the COVID-19 pandemic, it was reported that around half of A&E medical staff had tested positive for coronavirus.

See also
 St Woolos Hospital

References

Further reading

External links 

 
 Royal Gwent Hospital on the NHS 111 Wales website
 Healthcare Inspectorate Wales inspection reports

Aneurin Bevan University Health Board
NHS hospitals in Wales
Hospitals in Newport, Wales
Hospital buildings completed in 1901
History of Newport, Wales
Hospitals established in 1836 
Landmarks in Newport, Wales
Poor law infirmaries